Wojciech Zygmunt Pszoniak (2 May 1942 – 19 October 2020) was a Polish film and theatre actor.

Biography and career
Pszoniak was born in Lwów, Nazi occupied Poland, now in Ukraine. He gained international visibility following Andrzej Wajda's 1975 film The Promised Land, in which he played Moritz, one of the three main characters.

The actor left Poland during the period of political unrest in 1980–81, when the Solidarity trade union began and was ended by the imposition of martial law on 13 December 1981. Pszoniak found roles in France, where he was living and working. After the fall of communism in Eastern Europe in 1989, Pszoniak appeared in Polish movies and plays.

Internationally, he simplified his first name into Wojtek, which is the standard diminutive of the relatively formal Wojciech in the Polish language.

Pszoniak often played Jewish characters, although he was not of Jewish descent. In France, this was partially attributable to his role in The Promised Land, as well as his foreign accent.

Pszoniak did not speak French when he emigrated to France, so he learned his theatrical lines phonetically; in movies like Danton, where he played Robespierre, his voice was dubbed. An anecdote about his language skills relates that when he started speaking French, one director told him that he preferred his old accent.

He died in Warsaw, aged 78.

Selected filmography

 Twarz aniola (1971) – Ojciec Tadka
 The Devil (1972) – Diabel / Wybawca Jakuba-Jakub's savior
 The Wedding (1973) – Journalist / Stanczyk
 Gniazdo (1974) – Mieszko I
 The Promised Land (1975) – Moryc Welt
 Skazany (1976) – Ryszard Bielczyk
 Obrazki z zycia (1976) – Jerzy Wojciechowski
 Smuga cienia (1976)
 Motylem jestem, czyli romans czterdziestolatka (1976) – Redactor Oswald
 Sprawa Gorgonowej (1977) – Professor
 Rekolekcje (1978) – Marek
 Szpital Przemienienia (1979) – Dr. Marglewski
 The Tin Drum (1979) – Fajngold
 Aria dla atlety (1979) – Siedelmayer, dyrektor cyrku
 Golem (1980) – Prisoner
 Olympics 40 (1980) – Schulz
 Spokojne lata (1982)
 Limuzyna Daimler-Benz (1982) – Bogdanski
 Austeria (1982) – Josele
 Przeprowadzka (1982) – Andrzej Nowicki
 Danton (1983) – Robespierre
 Okno (1983) – Waiter
 Dangerous Moves (1984) – Le grand maître Felton – l'équipe de Fromm
 Angry Harvest (1985) – Cybulkowski
  (1986) – Gerhard Krall
 Je hais les acteurs (1986) – Hercule Potnik
 Mit meinen heißen Tränen (1986, TV Mini-Series) – Kajetan
 Le testament d'un poète juif assassiné (1988) – Judge
 Les Années sandwiches (1988) – Max
 To Kill a Priest (1988) – Bridge Player
 Deux (1989) – Walkowicz
 Coupe-franche (1989) – Gyuri
  (1989) – Antonio Vivaldi
 Monsieur (1990) – Kaltz
 Korczak (1990) – Janusz Korczak
 Gawin (1991) – Pierre / Xerkes
 Coupable d'innocence ou Quand la raison dort (1992) – Karl Ottenhagen
 Le bal des casse-pieds (1992) – Groboniek
 Vent d'est (1993) – Colonel Tcheko
 Ulysses' Gaze (1995) – (uncredited)
 Holy Week (1995) – Zamojski
  (1997) – The Stranger
 L'amour fou (1997)
 Deuxième vie (2000) – Vincent's father
 Bajland (2000) – Jan Rydel
 Chaos (2001) – Pali
 Le pacte du silence (2003) – L'archevêque
 Là-haut, un roi au-dessus des nuages (2003) – Le producteur
 Vipère au poing (2004) – Le père Volitza
 Strike (2006) – Kaminski
 Hope (2007) – Benedykt Weber
 The Lesser of Two Evils (2009) – Patient
 Mistification (2010) – Pinno
 Robert Mitchum est mort (2010) – Le recteur de l'école
 Mala matura 1947 (2010) – Major Trzaska
 Nie ten czlowiek (2010) – Baron
 Black Thursday (2011) – Władysław Gomułka
 Wygrany (2011) – Karloff
 Le chat du rabbin (2011) – Vastenov (voice)
 Battle of Warsaw 1920 (2011) – Maxime Weygand
 Kret (2011) – Stefan Grabek
 Cassos (2012) – Monsieur Lotz
 Rosemary's Baby (2014, TV Mini-Series) – Mr. Wees
 À la vie (2014) – L'imprimeur
 Carte Blanche (2015) – Professor
 Excentrycy, czyli po słonecznej stronie ulicy (2015) – Felicjan Zuppe
 Gdybyś mu zajrzał w serce (2017) – Le Polonais
 Conservative jester insults society (2019)
 Conservative jester yells at the result of elections (2019)

Selected honours and distinctions
Eagle Award for his role in Excentrycy, czyli po słonecznej stronie ulicy, (2016)
Best Supporting Actor Award at the Gdynia Film Festival for his role in Excentrycy, czyli po słonecznej stronie ulicy, (2015)
Commander's Cross of the Order of Polonia Restituta, (2011)
National Order of Merit, for his contributions to strengthening Polish-French relations in the field of culture, France (2008)
Golden Medal of the Medal for Merit to Culture – Gloria Artis, (2007)
Golden Cross of Merit, (1975)
Award of the Minister of Foreign Affairs of Poland, (1975)

See also 
Cinema of Poland
List of Poles

References

External links

 

1942 births
2020 deaths
Actors from Lviv
Polish male film actors
Polish theatre people